Charles Lambert Redd (February 18, 1908 – February 1, 1986) was an American athlete, who competed mainly in the long jump. Redd competed for America in the 1932 Summer Olympics held in Los Angeles, United States in the long jump, where he won the silver medal.

References

1908 births
1986 deaths
American male long jumpers
Olympic silver medalists for the United States in track and field
Athletes (track and field) at the 1932 Summer Olympics
Medalists at the 1932 Summer Olympics